Sabai Sabai Sesame, or Happy Happy Sesame in English, is the Cambodian version of the popular American children's series Sesame Street. 

It debuted 13 December 2005 on Apsara TV-11. The show was produced by Educational Television Cambodia in association with Sesame Workshop, through a grant from the United States embassy. Episodes were aired twice weekly in Khmer.

The show largely consisted of clips of the American production dubbed in Khmer by Babel Studios and Seven Colours.

External links
 News24.com: Cambodia to get Sesame Street

References 

Cambodian television series
Sesame Street international co-productions
Television shows featuring puppetry
2005 Cambodian television series debuts